Lee is a town in Berkshire County, Massachusetts, United States. It is part of the Pittsfield, Massachusetts, metropolitan statistical area. The population was 5,788 at the 2020 census. Lee, which includes the villages of South and East Lee, is part of the Berkshires resort area.

History

Lee occupies land that was originally territory of Mahican Indians. The first non-native settlement in the area was known as Dodgetown as early as 1760. Dodgetown was named after its founding settler, Asahel Dodge, who immigrated to the area from Cape Cod. Lee was incorporated in 1777 from parts of Great Barrington and Washington. It is named after Revolutionary War General Charles Lee. Lee is a former mill town.

In the autumn of 1786 during Shays' Rebellion, about 250 followers of Daniel Shays encountered state troops commanded by General John Paterson near East Lee. The Shaysites paraded a fake cannon crafted from a yarn beam, and the troops fled.

Early industries included agriculture, lumbering, and lime making. Abundant streams and rivers provided water power for mills that produced textiles and wire. Papermaking became the principal industry in 1806 with the construction of the Willow Mill by Samuel Church in South Lee. The Columbia Mill in central Lee was established in 1827, and eventually became the first to supply 100% groundwood newsprint to The New York Times. By 1857, there were 25 paper mills in Lee. The Smith Paper Company discovered how to manufacture paper solely from wood pulp in 1867, and through the 1870s was the country's largest producer of paper. The mills previously owned by Smith Paper Company were closed in 2008. Today, Lee has only a single papermaking facility.

The town's marble is famous for its quality. The first quarry was established in 1852. In 1867, almost  of marble was excavated and shipped on the Housatonic Railroad. Buildings constructed of Lee marble include a wing of the Capitol in Washington, 250 sculptures adorning Philadelphia City Hall, as well as the General Grant National Memorial, and St. Patrick's Cathedral (both in New York City).

The town's 19th-century prosperity is still evident in its architecture, including its town hall, library, several churches and private homes. South Lee includes a historic district listed on the National Register.

Lee has become a popular tourist destination, noted both for its New England charm and its bed and breakfast establishments. It is known as the "Gateway to The Berkshires" because it provides one of only two exits on the Massachusetts Turnpike that serve the county, and the only one going eastbound.

Arlo Guthrie's court appearance before the blind judge and his seeing-eye dog for dumping garbage as described in the song "Alice's Restaurant" took place in the courtroom at the Lee Town Hall.

Lee was a filming location for Before and After (1996) and The Cider House Rules (1999).

Geography

Lee is bordered by Lenox to the northwest, Washington to the northeast, Becket to the east, Tyringham in the southeast, Great Barrington to the southwest, and Stockbridge to the west.

Lee is in the southern section of the Berkshires, in a valley along the Housatonic River. It is west of October Mountain State Forest, with two sections of the forest in Lee. In the southwest corner of town lies a portion of Beartown State Forest, where Burgoyne Pass crosses the northern end of the mountain. Hop Brook, a marshy brook which flows from Tyringham, flows into the Housatonic in the south; other bodies of water include Laurel Lake to the north and Goose Pond to the southeast. The Appalachian Trail skirts the eastern part of town, passing through Tyringham, Becket and Washington.

Lee is on Interstate 90 (the Massachusetts Turnpike), and is home to Exit 10, the westernmost full exit on the turnpike (Exit 1, in West Stockbridge, is only a turnaround exit) as well as the first service area along the Pike. Lee is also on U.S. Route 20, the "old Mass Pike", which was the main route to New York until the interstate. A small section of U.S. Route 7 crosses through the northwest corner of town before meeting Route 20 in Lenox. Massachusetts Route 102's eastern terminus is at Route 20 at the Exit 2 toll plaza.

Lee lies along the Housatonic Railroad line, which travels from Pittsfield to Great Barrington and Sheffield, terminating near at New Milford, Connecticut, near Danbury. The line is still the area's primary rail link to New York City's metropolitan area, Boston, and Albany. As of 2013 negotiations are underway to restore rail commuter service between the Berkshires and New York City along this route. The town is covered by the Berkshire Regional Transit Authority (BRTA) bus line, which runs between Pittsfield and Great Barrington. Regional bus services make regular daily stops, and maintain year-round schedules through Lee. Peter Pan and Bonanza Bus Lines each make scheduled stops at Town Hall.

Regional air service can be reached at Pittsfield Municipal Airport.

Climate
Lee experiences a humid continental climate with cold winters and warm summers.

Demographics

As of the census of 2000, there were 5,985 people, 2,442 households, and 1,606 families residing in the town. By population, Lee ranks seventh out of the 32 cities and towns in Berkshire County, and 227th out of 351 cities and towns in Massachusetts. The racial makeup of the town was 96.93% White, 0.62% Black or African American, 0.15% Native American, 0.95% Asian, 0.02% Pacific Islander, 0.74% from other races, and 0.60% from two or more races. Hispanic or Latino of any race were 2.49% of the population.

There were 2,492 households, out of which 28.6% had children under the age of 18 living with them, 51.7% were married couples living together, 10.2% had a female householder with no husband present, and 34.2% were non-families. 28.2% of all households were made up of individuals, and 12.6% had someone living alone who was 65 years of age or older.  The average household size was 2.39 and the average family size was 2.91.

In the town, the population was spread out, with 22.1% under the age of 18, 7.0% from 18 to 24, 28.5% from 25 to 44, 25.6% from 45 to 64, and 16.8% who were 65 years of age or older.  The median age was 40 years. For every 100 females, there were 94.0 males.  For every 100 females age 18 and over, there were 92.1 males.

The median income for a household in the town was $41,556, and the median income for a family was $49,630. Males had a median income of $35,565 versus $26,232 for females. The per capita income for the town was $19,799.  About 2.5% of families and 6.7% of the population were below the poverty line, including 3.4% of those under age 18 and 4.2% of those age 65 or over.

Government
Lee is the least populous municipality in Massachusetts not to use the open town meeting form of government; instead, it uses the representative town meeting, and is led by a board of selectmen and a town administrator. Lee has its own police, fire and public works departments, as well as a post office. The town's library is a member of the regional library networks.

On the state level, Lee is represented in the Massachusetts House of Representatives by the Fourth Berkshire district, which covers southern Berkshire County, as well as the westernmost towns in Hampden County. In the Massachusetts Senate, the town is represented by the Berkshire, Hampshire and Franklin district, which includes all of Berkshire County and western Hampshire and Franklin counties. The town is home to the First Station of Barracks "B" of the Massachusetts State Police.

On the national level, Lee is part of Massachusetts's 1st congressional district, represented by Richard Neal of Springfield, Massachusetts. Massachusetts is represented in the United States Senate by senior Senator Elizabeth Warren and junior Senator Ed Markey.

Education

Lee operates its own school department, which also serves the town of Tyringham, and has an option to serve Otis and Sandisfield. Lee Elementary School serves students from pre-kindergarten through sixth grades, and the Lee Middle and High School serves students from seventh through twelfth grades. Lee's athletics teams are nicknamed the Wildcats, and their colors are black and orange. Additionally, Lee is home to Saint Mary's School, a parochial school which serves students through eighth grade. Other private schools can be found in Great Barrington and other surrounding towns.

The nearest community college is the South County Center of Berkshire Community College in Great Barrington, and the nearest state university is Massachusetts College of Liberal Arts. The nearest private college is Bard College at Simon's Rock.

Sites of interest
 Festival Latino of the Berkshires
 Golden Hill Bridge
 Hyde House
 Hyde School
 Lee historic railroad station
 Lower Main Street Historic District
 Museum of Animation, Special Effects & Art
 October Mountain State Forest
 South Lee Historic District
 Unique Specialty Shops of Main Street

Notable people

 John M. Barlow, politician and businessman
 Nathan B. Bradley, congressman
 Henry Billings Brown, Associate Justice of the U.S. Supreme Court
 Michelle Cuevas, author
 Thomas C. Durant, financier and railroad promoter
 Frank Dwyer, baseball pitcher
 Elisha Foote, judge, inventor, and mathematician
 Henri Gosselin, politician
 Addison H. Laflin, congressman
 Wayne Larrivee, sportscaster
 Augusta Read Thomas, composer
 Edward V. Whiton, Chief Justice of the Wisconsin Supreme Court
Debra Jo Rupp, actress

Notes

References

External links
 
 
 Lee Library
 Lee Chamber of Commerce
 TownofLee.com

 
Towns in Berkshire County, Massachusetts
Towns in Massachusetts
1760 establishments in Massachusetts